Alberto Sorrentino (16 February 1916 – 31 January 1994), was an Italian film actor. He appeared in 89 films between 1943 and 1988. He was born in La Spezia, Italy.

Selected filmography

 The Last Wagon (1943) - Un passante
 I cadetti di Guascogna (1950) - Il comico
 Totò Tarzan (1950) - L'usciere
 I'm the Capataz (1951) - Un rivoluzionario
 Arrivano i nostri (1951) - Guido, il morto di fame
 Milano miliardaria (1951) - Oscar, il fotografo
 Accidents to the Taxes!! (1951) - Arturo
 Toto the Third Man (1951) - Giovannino - Il giornalista
 Seven Hours of Trouble (1951) - Raffaele
 The Steamship Owner (1951) - Il disegnatore
 My Heart Sings (1951) - 'Signorina'
 Stasera sciopero (1951)
 Tizio, Caio, Sempronio (1951)
 Viva il cinema! (1952) - Giovanni
 Sardinian Vendetta (1952) - Narciso Bellezza
 Abracadabra (1952) - Fernando, detto Fefè
 Maschera nera (1952)
 Beauties in Capri (1952) - Pasquale
 In Olden Days (1952) - (segment "Il processo di Frine") (uncredited)
 Five Paupers in an Automobile (1952) - Il padrone ansioso
 I tre corsari (1952) - Agonia
 Giovinezza (1952) - Venditore ambulante
 The Piano Tuner Has Arrived (1952) - Signor Narducci
 Drama on the Tiber (1952) - Il saputello
 Jolanda, the Daughter of the Black Corsair (1953) - Agonia
 Una donna prega (1953) - Beniamino
 Fermi tutti... arrivo io! (1953) - Fotografo
 Martin Toccaferro (1953)
 Funniest Show on Earth (1953) - Bastian
 Anni facili (1953)
 Ivan, Son of the White Devil (1953) - Stepan
 Viva la rivista! (1953)
 If You Won a Hundred Million (1953) - Un impiegato (segment "Il principale")
 Passione (1953)
 Finalmente libero! (1953) - Ernesto
 Anna perdonami (1953)
 La prigioniera di Amalfi (1954)
 The Country of the Campanelli (1954) - Il marinaio ebete
 Genoese Dragnet (1954) - Autista dell'autocisterna (uncredited)
 It Happened at the Police Station (1954) - Comic actor
 Naples Is Always Naples (1954)
 Trieste cantico d'amore (1954) - Albert
 La tua donna (1954)
 Bertoldo, Bertoldino e Cacasenno (1954) - Bertoldino
 Cuore di mamma (1955) - Baron De Pasquale
 Suor Maria (1955) - Il regista
 Da qui all'eredità (1955) - Alberto
 Faccia da mascalzone (1956)
 I giorni più belli (1956) - L'usciere del provveditorato
 Cantando sotto le stelle (1956) - Augusto Pezzetti 1°
 Pirate of the Half Moon (1957)
 I dritti (1957) - Limon Limonero
 Il tiranno del Garda (1957)
 Le dritte (1958) - 'Dolcecuore'
 Valeria ragazza poco seria (1958)
 L'amore nasce a Roma (1958) - Rubino
 Sorrisi e canzoni (1958)
 Arriva la banda (1959)
 Non perdiamo la testa (1959) - Cameriere
 La cento chilometri (1959) - The Man Who Refuses Underpants (uncredited)
 Il terrore dell'Oklahoma (1959)
 Quanto sei bella Roma (1959)
 Agosto, donne mie non vi conosco (1959)
 Simpatico mascalzone (1959) - Giulebbe
 Prepotenti più di prima (1959) - Mimmo
 La sceriffa (1960) - Brutto Tempo - the native American
 Appuntamento a Ischia (1960) - The Doorkeeper (uncredited)
 The Giants of Thessaly (1960) - Licaone
 Caravan petrol (1960) - Omar
 A Qualcuna Piace Calvo (1960) - Moreno
 Cronache del '22 (1961)
 Boccaccio '70 (1962) - Worker (segment "Le tentazioni del dottor Antonio") (uncredited)
 The Seventh Sword (1962) - Sancho
 Gli onorevoli (1963) - Ercole Ssnsoni
 Vino, whisky e acqua salata (1963)
 The Mona Lisa Has Been Stolen (1966) - le domestique et chauffeur de Vincent
 Cuore matto... matto da legare (1967)
 Donne... botte e bersaglieri (1968) - Hairdresser's assistant
 Vacanze sulla Costa Smeralda (1968)
 I 2 pompieri (1968) - Priest
 Ms. Stiletto (1969) - Uno zingaro
 Poppea's Hot Nights (1969) - Drusilla's John
 Lady Barbara (1970) - The Waiter Ambrogio
 Armiamoci e partite! (1971) - Train Passenger with bag
 Jus primae noctis (1972) - The friar
 Ubalda, All Naked and Warm (1972) - Notaio Adone Bellezza
 Torso (1973) - Countryman / First Crime Scene (uncredited)
 Il gatto di Brooklyn aspirante detective (1973) - Lazzaro De Li Mortazzi - the watchman of 'Villa Allegra'
 Il lumacone (1974) - Tipografo
 Il santo patrono (1975)
 Occhio alla vedova! (1976)
 Action (1980) - Garibaldi
 Una botta di vita (1988)

References

External links

1916 births
1994 deaths
Italian male film actors
20th-century Italian male actors
Burials at the Cimitero Flaminio